GDN is a three letter acronym which may refer to:

 The IATA code for Gdańsk Lech Wałęsa Airport in Poland
 Gulf Daily News, an English newspaper in Bahrain
 Global Development Network, a network of research and policy institutes
 Gangster Disciples, a street and prison gang in Chicago, United States